The Junior Eurovision Song Contest 2018 was the sixteenth edition of the annual Junior Eurovision Song Contest, organised by the Belarusian Television and Radio Company (BTRC) and the European Broadcasting Union (EBU). It took place in the Belarusian capital city, Minsk on 25 November 2018 at the Minsk-Arena.

Last year's winner Polina Bogusevich performed her entry again as the interval act, alongside the common song "#LightUp" sung by all the participants.

The winner was Roksana Węgiel, who represented  with the song "Anyone I Want to Be". Poland won the Junior Eurovision Song Contest for the first time. Returning country  came second, their best result at the contest, while  placed third for the second year in a row.  was the fourth best performing debuting nation, after  and  's victories in 2003 and 2014 respectively, and 's second place in 2007, finishing sixth, whilst  came last.

Location 

The EBU confirmed on 15 October 2017, that the contest would be hosted by Belarus. This was the second time Belarus hosts the Junior Eurovision Song contest, after hosting the  contest.

Venue 
On 21 November 2017, Belarus' Deputy Prime Minister Vasily Zharko confirmed that the contest was scheduled to be held at Minsk-Arena in November 2018. The arena previously hosted the 2010 contest. However, on 26 November 2017, it was confirmed by the host broadcaster that the exact location of the contest is still unknown, stating that Minsk Arena was one of the possible options. On 18 March 2018, the 15,000-capacity Minsk-Arena was confirmed as the venue by the contest organisers.

Format

Visual design

The slogan was the hashtag #LightUp. The logo of the contest was based around a morning star made of vertically inverted soundwaves. The source of inspiration was the artistic potential and creative aspiration of the young participants who fill the scene like a star.

Hosts

On 26 October 2018, it was announced that Eugene Perlin and Zinaida Kupriyanovich would be the main hosts of the contest, together with Helena Meraai in the green room. Meraai previously  in the 2017 contest, where she placed fifth with the song "". Perlin is one of the main country's television presenters and was the Eurovision commentator between 2013 and 2019, whilst Kupriyanovich is a singer and artist who has participated in Belarus' national selections for the 2015 and 2016 Junior Eurovision Song Contests and latter represented the country at the 2019 adult contest. It was also announced that Denis Dudinsky and Anna Kviloria would host the opening ceremony.

Voting
The results were determined by national juries and an online audience vote. Every country used a national jury that consisted of three music industry professionals and two kids aged between 10 and 15 who were citizens of the country they represent. The first phase of the online voting started on 23 November 2018 when a recap of all the rehearsal performances were shown on the official website before the viewers could vote. Following this recap, voters had the option to watch longer one-minute clips from each participant's rehearsal. This first round of voting ended on 25 November at 15:59 CET. The second phase of the online voting took place during the live show and started after the last performance and was open for 15 minutes. International viewers could vote for a minimum of three countries and a maximum of five, including their own country.

The number of points were determined by the percentage of votes received. The public vote counted for 50% of the final result, while the other 50% came from the professional juries.

Trophy
The trophy was designed by Kjell Engman of the Swedish glass company Kosta Boda, using the same design as was first introduced in the 2017 contest. The main trophy is a glass microphone with colored lines inside the upper part, which symbolize the flow of sound.

Postcards 
Each postcard took place in a different location in Belarus. They all consisted of the upcoming participant putting on a virtual reality headset and, through it, experiencing a location in Belarus while doing various activities. At the conclusion of the postcard, the upcoming participant would take their headset off, and the performance would commence.

 Chelyuskintsev Park, Minsk
 Čyžoŭka Arena, Minsk
 Lake Strusta
 Strochitsy
 Minsk
 Independence Palace, Minsk
 Minsk
 Belovezhskaya Pushcha National Park
 Dinamo Stadium, Minsk
 Belarusian National Arts Museum, Minsk
 Minsk railway station and the Belarusian countryside
 Mir Castle
 Strochitsy
 National Library of Belarus, Minsk
 Minsk
 Minsk
 National Opera and Ballet of Belarus, Minsk
 A farm and stable, the Belarusian countryside
 Minsk
 Nesvizh Castle

Participating countries 

On 25 July 2018, the EBU released the official list of participants with 18 competing countries. 
Later, this number was specially expanded to 19. Since 
 had won the adult contest that year, KAN should register a participant and send an observer delegation to Minsk.  were invited to make their debut appearance in the contest this year.

Despite initially withdrawing from the contest on 2 July 2018 due to financial and structural difficulties,  was added at the last hour to the list of participating countries on 2 August 2018, setting a record of 20 participating countries.

Detailed voting results

12 points
Below is a summary of all 12 points received from each country's professional juries.

Spokespersons 

 Anastasiya Baginska
 Nadezhda Sidorova
 Aruzhan Khafiz
 Daniil Lazuko
 Dina Baru and Khryusha
 Vincent Miranovich
 Valeh Huseynbeyli
 Arina Rovba
 Alex Hynes
 Lana Karić
 Yan Musvidas
 Ksenia Galetskaya
 Nikoloz Vasadze
 Adi
 Daniil Rotenko and Lubava Marchuk
 Arina Pekhtereva
 Vardan Margaryan
 Gwen Rowley
 Milana Borodko
 Grace

Online voting 
A total of 1,283,921 valid votes were received during the voting windows.

Other countries 
For a country to be eligible for potential participation in the Junior Eurovision Song Contest, it needs to be an active member of the EBU. It is currently unknown whether the EBU issue invitations of participation to all 56 active members like they do for the Eurovision Song Contest.

Active EBU members 
 On 25 May 2018, the Bosnian broadcaster Radio and Television of Bosnia and Herzegovina (BHRT) stated that they would not be allowed to debut at the contest in the near future until the debt-related sanctions placed on them by the EBU were lifted.
 On 16 February 2018, it was reported that the EBU was calling on Danish broadcaster Danish Broadcasting Corporation (DR) to return to the contest after an 11-year break. However, Jan Lagermand Lundme, the head of Entertainment at the Danish broadcaster, played down the likelihood of Denmark returning to the competition, saying "Now, never say never, but as long as the show is, as it is now, I’m definitely not going to compete again. The values that we put in Denmark in a program for children do not match the values of the Junior Eurovision Song Contest… It seems that the children are on stage and play adults instead of acting as children, and we think that is fundamentally wrong. Children must be children, they should not try to strive to be something they are not. It’s super bad for us, because we really wanted to be part of the show. Participating in a concept like Junior Eurovision would be a natural step for us after MGP, but it does not work when we do not feel the show fits the Danish values."
 On 28 February 2018, the Lithuanian broadcaster Lithuanian National Radio and Television (LRT) declared that they would not return to contest in the near future. LRT executive producer Audrius Giržadas stated that "this contest has become a clone of the main Eurovision Song Contest and has nothing to do with childhood, little girls go on stage with clipped hairs, glued eyelashes and bare belly, copying Beyoncé and Christina Aguilera – this is not an event that we would like to participate in."
 On 2 January 2018, the Belarusian broadcaster National State Television and Radio Company of the Republic of Belarus (BTRC) announced that a representative from an unknown British broadcaster would be attending the supervisory meeting for the 2018 contest. Two days later it was confirmed that the United Kingdom would not take part in the Steering Group meetings. Wales, a country that is part of the United Kingdom, competed.

Broadcasts

Official album

Junior Eurovision Song Contest Minsk 2018 is a compilation album put together by the European Broadcasting Union, and was released by Universal Music Group on 16 November 2018. The album features all the songs from the 2018 contest.

See also 
 Eurovision Song Contest 2018
 Eurovision Young Musicians 2018

References

External links 

 
2018
2018 song contests
2018 in Belarus
2010s in Minsk
Events in Minsk
November 2018 events in Europe